The Mitsubishi Saturn or 4G3 engine is series of overhead camshaft (OHC) straight-four internal combustion engines introduced by Mitsubishi Motors and saw first service in the 1969 Colt Galant. The early versions have chain driven valvetrain while the later versions are belt driven and equipped with balance shafts.

4G30

The 4G30 displaces . It is an 8-valve SOHC design with an aluminium head and iron block. The engine has five main bearings.

Bore x Stroke:

Applications
 1969.12-1971.09 Mitsubishi Galant A I (A51)

4G31

The 4G31 displaces . It is an 8-valve SOHC design with an aluminium head and iron block. The engine has five main bearings. Power was  depending on which carburetor combo was used. An updated version with central-point electronic fuel injection was installed in Mirages and Lancers from 1986 on. A version for industrial use has  at 3000 rpm.

Bore x Stroke:

Applications
 1969.12 – 1971.09 Mitsubishi Galant A II, A III (A52)
 1986–1987 Mitsubishi Mirage
 Mitsubishi FG20 Forklift

4G32
In 1970, the 4G32 was introduced, and it displaces . It is an eight-valve SOHC design with an aluminium head and iron block. The engine has five main bearings, a cross flow head and a single down draught carburetor. Firing order is 1-3-4-2.

A version with an early iteration of Mitsubishi's MCA lean-burn system (MCA-IIB), fulfilling the intermediate Japanese exhaust regulations for 1975, was called G32A. This was built for less than one year, as the new MCA engine arrived in November 1975. Those with the later, cleaner yet, "MCA-Jet" system were called G32B. Later, the G32B also came in a fuel injected, turbocharged model. For competition, a version of the 4G32 engine was made with a DOHC eight-valve cylinder head, and fitted with two twin-choke  Solex sidedraft carburettors.

Bore x Stroke: 

 Mitsubishi Celeste
 Mitsubishi Galant
 Mitsubishi L200
 Mitsubishi L300
 1973.02 – 1979.03 Mitsubishi Lancer (A73A)
 1977.06 – 1979.03 Mitsubishi Lancer (A144A, G32B)
 1975.03 – 1979.06 Mitsubishi (Lancer) Celeste (A73A)
 1975.03 – 1975.11 Mitsubishi (Lancer) Celeste (A77A, G32A)
 1977.07 – 1981.07 Mitsubishi (Lancer) Celeste (A144, G32B)
 1980–1987 Mitsubishi Lancer EX (A174A)
 Mitsubishi Galant Lambda/Sapporo
 Mitsubishi Sigma
 Mitsubishi Sapporo
 Mitsubishi Cordia
 Mitsubishi Tredia
 Mitsubishi Mirage
 Dodge Colt
 Eagle Vista Turbo
 Hyundai Pony
 Hyundai Stellar
 Mazda Familia
 Plymouth Arrow

4G32T
Turbocharged version of the 4G32.

4G33
The 4G3 displaces  from a  bore and stroke. There was also an MCA-Jet equipped G33B developed to fulfill the 1978 Japanese emissions regulations.

 Mitsubishi Celeste
 1979.06-1989.01 Mitsubishi Delica
 Mitsubishi Galant
 1973.02-1977.06 Mitsubishi Lancer (A72A)
 1977.06-1978.04 Mitsubishi Lancer (A143A, G33B)
 1973.09-1979.03 Mitsubishi Lancer (A72V)
 1975.03-1977.06 Mitsubishi (Lancer) Celeste (A72A)
 1977.07-1978.03 Mitsubishi (Lancer) Celeste (A143, G33B)
 Hyundai Pony
 Hyundai Stellar
 Plymouth Arrow
 Mitsubishi FG15T Forklift (1979)

4G35

The 4G35 displaces . It is an 8-valve SOHC design with an aluminium head and iron block. The engine has five main bearings. Power was  depending on which carburetor combo was used.

Bore x Stroke: 

Applications:
 1973.01-1973.06 Mitsubishi Galant GS (A55)
 1972.02-1976 Mitsubishi Galant GTO (A55C)

4G36
The 4G36 displaces .  bore and stroke.

Applications:
 Mitsubishi Celeste
 Mitsubishi Colt
 Mitsubishi Lancer

4G37
The 8-valve SOHC 4G37 displaces .

Bore x Stroke: 

Compression Ratio: 9.5:1

Applications:
 Mitsubishi Chariot/Space Wagon 1983–91
 Mitsubishi Cordia
 Mitsubishi Galant
 Mitsubishi Eclipse 1990–1994
 Mitsubishi Lancer/Lancer Fiore/Mirage - 4WD only
 Mitsubishi Tredia
By other brands:
 Eagle Talon DL 1993–1994
 Plymouth Laser 1990–1994

6G34
The 6G34, referred to by Mitsubishi as the Saturn 6, is a 12-valve SOHC straight-6 of  displacement.

The 6G34 was used only in the Mitsubishi Debonair Executive from September 1970 to June 1976, and saw very limited production. Effectively, the design was that of the standard Saturn four-cylinder block with two additional cylinders grafted on to replace the KE64.

Applications:
 Mitsubishi Debonair 1970.09-1976.06 (Japan only)

See also

 List of Mitsubishi engines
 List of Hyundai engines
 List of engines used in Chrysler products

References

 "Engine Epic Part 8 - Mitsubishi Engines", Michael Knowling, Autospeed, issue 48, 21 September 1999

Saturn
Straight-six engines
Gasoline engines by model
Straight-four engines